The Women's EHF Cup Winners' Cup was the official competition for women's handball clubs of Europe that won their national cup, and took place every year from 1976 to 2016 (until 1993 organized by IHF instead of EHF). From the 2016–17 season, the competition will be merged with the EHF Cup.

Summary

Records and statistics

Winners

Winners by country

See also
 Women's EHF Champions League
 Women's EHF Cup
 Women's EHF Challenge Cup

References

External links  
 
 
 List of Women's EHF Cup Winners' Cup champions – Worldhandball.com

 
European Handball Federation competitions
Women's handball competitions
Recurring sporting events established in 1976
Recurring sporting events disestablished in 2016